The Shire of Manjimup is a local government area in the South West region of Western Australia, about  south of the state capital, Perth.

History
The Shire area was first included in the Plantagenet, Wellington and Sussex Road Districts in 1871. Later the area was included in the Nelson Road District.

The Shire of Manjimup originated as the Warren Road District, which was gazetted on 3 July 1908, initially consisting of seven elected members. It was renamed the Manjimup Road District on 23 January 1925. On 1 July 1961, it became the Shire of Manjimup following the passage of the Local Government Act 1960, which reformed all remaining road districts into shires.

Wards
The Shire is divided into six wards, most of which were renamed at the 2003 election. The shire president is elected from amongst the councillors.

 Central Ward (Manjimup) (four councillors)
 Coastal Ward (Northcliffe) (one councillor)
 East Ward (Perup) (one councillor)
 North Ward (one councillor)
 South Ward (Walpole) (one councillor)
 West Ward (Pemberton) (two councillors)

Towns and localities
The towns and localities of the Shire of Manjimup with population and size figures based on the most recent Australian census:

Heritage-listed places

As of 2023, 271 places are heritage-listed in the Shire of Manjimup, of which 16 are on the State Register of Heritage Places.

References

External links
 

Manjimup